Allan Ralph Rogers (born 24 October 1932) is a Labour Party politician in the United Kingdom.  He was Member of the European Parliament (MEP) for South East Wales from 1979 to 1984, and Member of Parliament (MP) for Rhondda in Wales from 1983 until he stepped down at the 2001 general election.

Parliamentary career 
During his time as an MP, Rogers served on the Welsh Affairs Committee, Public Accounts Committee and the European Scrutiny Committee.

The Guardian reported that he was being offered a peerage in return for another candidate taking his seat, as it is one of Labour's safest, an offer which he allegedly rejected.

References

External links 
 

1932 births
Living people
Confederation of Health Service Employees-sponsored MPs
Welsh Labour Party MPs
UK MPs 1983–1987
UK MPs 1987–1992
UK MPs 1992–1997
UK MPs 1997–2001
Welsh Labour MEPs
MEPs for Wales 1979–1984